Ahmad Naadir Nivins (born February 10, 1987) is a former American professional basketball player currently working as an assistant coach for the Lakeland Magic of the NBA G League. He played college basketball for Saint Joseph's.

High school career
Nivins attended County Prep High School in New Jersey, where he began as a baseball player before switching to basketball in his freshman year. In his junior year he transferred to St. Anthony's High school, which is also in New Jersey. As a senior, he averaged 15 points, 10 rebounds and five blocks and helped the team to a 30–0 record and the school's ninth Tournament of Champions title in 2003–04.

College career
Nivins attended Saint Joseph's University. He is the school's leader in career field goal percentage (63.4%) and also one of 26 Hawks to record 1,000 points and 500 rebounds in his career. Nivins is fifth on the team's all-time list with 110 blocks.

As a senior, he averaged a double-double (19.2 points, 11.8 rebounds) and nationally, he ranked fourth in rebounds per game behind John Bryant, Blake Griffin and Kenneth Faried.

Nivins was the 2009 Atlantic-10 Player of the Year and 2009 Big 5 Player of the Year.

In 2018, he was enshrined in the Saint Joseph's University Basketball Hall of Fame.

In 2022, Nivins was inducted into the Philadelphia Big 5 Hall of Fame.

Professional career
After being selected by the Dallas Mavericks with the 56th overall pick of the 2009 NBA draft, on August 6, 2009, he signed for Bàsquet Manresa in the Spanish ACB.

On January 4, 2011, he signed with Belgian team Dexia Mons-Hainaut. On December 10, his draft rights were traded to the New York Knicks, along with the draft rights to Giorgos Printezis and Tyson Chandler in a three-way trade. The Mavericks received Andy Rautins from the Knicks and a second round pick from the Washington Wizards. The Wizards received Ronny Turiaf from the Knicks in addition to a Dallas 2012 second round pick, and 2013 Knicks second round pick, and cash considerations.

On August 20, 2012, Nivins moved to the French league, signing with Poitiers Basket 86 after averaging 10.4 points and 4.7 rebounds in 2011–12 in Belgium.

On June 21, 2013, Nivins signed with Élan Béarnais Pau-Orthez after averaging 14.4 points and 6.2 rebounds per game with Poitiers.

On June 3, 2014, Nivins signed with ASVEL Basket after averaging 15.5 points and 6.3 rebounds with Pau-Orthez.

On June 14, 2016, Nivins signed with Orléans Loiret Basket. On March 20, 2017, he parted ways with Orléans.

On November 11, 2017, Nivins signed with the Israeli team Hapoel Tel Aviv for the 2017–18 season. However, on November 17, 2017, Nivins was released by Hapoel before appearing in a game for them.

College statistics

|-
| style="text-align:left;"| 2005–06
| style="text-align:left;"| Saint Joseph's
| 30 || 12 || 22.7 || .613 || .000 || .706 || 4.97 || 0.27 || 0.40 || 1.30 || 6.13
|-
| style="text-align:left;"| 2006–07
| style="text-align:left;"| Saint Joseph's
| 31 || 31 || 34.9 || .630 || .000 || .678 || 7.58 || 0.35 || 1.03 || 1.03 || 16.65
|-
| style="text-align:left;"| 2007–08
| style="text-align:left;"| Saint Joseph's
| 33 || 33 || 33.7 || .647 || .000 || .741 || 5.85 || 0.48 || 0.67 || 1.18 || 14.42
|-
| style="text-align:left;"| 2008–09
| style="text-align:left;"| Saint Joseph's
| 32 || 32 || 39.3 || .612 || .000 || .787 || 11.81 || 1.00 || 0.81 || 1.75 || 19.16

Personal life
Nivins majored in sociology. Nivins' father, Larry, played basketball at Slippery Rock University.

He currently resides in Central Florida with his partner, Justine and together they have 3 children.

References

External links
 Saint Joseph's bio
 French League profile

1987 births
Living people
American expatriate basketball people in Belgium
American expatriate basketball people in France
American expatriate basketball people in Spain
American men's basketball players
ASVEL Basket players
Basketball players from Jersey City, New Jersey
Bàsquet Manresa players
Belfius Mons-Hainaut players
Dallas Mavericks draft picks
Élan Béarnais players
Liga ACB players
Orléans Loiret Basket players
Poitiers Basket 86 players
Power forwards (basketball)
Saint Joseph's Hawks men's basketball players